Elsa Liliana Chalá Mejía (born June 7, 1965) is a retired female track and field athlete from Ecuador, who competed in the 400 m hurdling and sprints events.

She represented her native country twice at the Summer Olympics: 1988 and 1992.

She set a personal best of  23.74 seconds in the 200 Metres at an event in São Paulo on October 9, 1987.

International competitions

1Representing the Americas

References

1965 births
Living people
Ecuadorian female hurdlers
Ecuadorian female sprinters
Olympic athletes of Ecuador
Pan American Games competitors for Ecuador
Athletes (track and field) at the 1987 Pan American Games
Athletes (track and field) at the 1988 Summer Olympics
Athletes (track and field) at the 1992 Summer Olympics
World Athletics Championships athletes for Ecuador
South American Games gold medalists for Ecuador
South American Games bronze medalists for Ecuador
South American Games medalists in athletics
Competitors at the 1986 South American Games
Competitors at the 1990 South American Games
21st-century Ecuadorian women